Pysząca may refer to the following places in Poland:
Pysząca, Lower Silesian Voivodeship (south-west Poland)
Pysząca, Greater Poland Voivodeship (west-central Poland)